Gopal Krishna (born 12 March 1948) is an Indian radio astronomer and a senior professor at the National Centre for Radio Astrophysics. Known for his studies on Radio galaxies and quasars, Krishna is an elected fellow of all the three major Indian science academies viz. Indian Academy of Sciences, National Academy of Sciences, India and Indian National Science Academy. The Council of Scientific and Industrial Research, the apex agency of the Government of India for scientific research, awarded him the Shanti Swarup Bhatnagar Prize for Science and Technology, one of the highest Indian science awards, for his contributions to physical sciences in 1993.

Biography 

Born on 12 March 1948 in the National Capital Region of Delhi, Gopal Krishna completed his graduate studies at Agra University in 1966 before joining BARC Training School at Bhabha Atomic Research Centre. After a short stint, he moved to Tata Institute of Fundamental Research at their newly established Radio Astronomy Group in 1967 as a research associate. It was during this time, he was mentored by Govind Swarup and his research with the help of the Ooty Radio Telescope earned him a PhD from the University of Mumbai in 1977. Subsequently, he moved to the Max Planck Institute for Radio Astronomy for his post-doctoral work as an Alexander von Humboldt fellow and on his return in 1980, he resumed his career with Tata Institute Fundamental Research. In 2002, he moved to Pune to join National Centre for Radio Astrophysics where he was involved in the commissioning of Giant Metrewave Radio Telescope and holds the position of a senior professor there.

Legacy 
Gopal Krishna's research was focused on radio galaxies and quasars from observational and theoretical perspectives. He is known to have developed a relativistic-beam model which has reported use in ascertaining the luminosity of galaxies and quasars as well as in studying the cosmological evolution of linear sizes. Besides, he is also credited with the discovery of galaxies and clusters at high redshifts. His studies have been documented by way of a number of articles and the online article repository of the Indian Academy of Sciences has listed 102 of them. He has also guided a number of doctoral scholars in their research. Towards the latter part of his career, he served as a visiting faculty at several institutions including Space Telescope Science Institute, Baltimore, European Southern Observatory, Santiago and Max Planck Institute for Radio Astronomy. He sat in the International Advisory Committee of the International Year of Astronomy organized by the International Astronomical Union in 2009 and chaired the closing session of its UNESCO inaugural ceremony held in Paris in January 2009. He has also lectured worldwide and the lecture on Understanding X-shaped radio galaxies presented on 21 September 2010 at the University of Sheffield was one among them.

Awards and honors 
The Council of Scientific and Industrial Research awarded him the Shanti Swarup Bhatnagar Prize, one of the highest Indian science awards in 1993. The same year, he was elected as a fellow by the National Academy of Sciences, India. This was followed by the elected fellowships from the Indian Academy of Sciences in 1993 and the Indian National Science Academy 2010.

Selected bibliography

See also 
 Observational cosmology

Notes

References

External links 
 
 
 
 

Recipients of the Shanti Swarup Bhatnagar Award in Physical Science
Indian scientific authors
Fellows of the Indian Academy of Sciences
1947 births
Fellows of the Indian National Science Academy
Fellows of The National Academy of Sciences, India
Academic staff of Tata Institute of Fundamental Research
University of Mumbai alumni
Dr. Bhimrao Ambedkar University alumni
Radio astronomers
Scientists from Delhi
20th-century Indian astronomers
Living people